Bathybagrus graueri is a species of claroteid catfish endemic to Lake Tanganyika on the border of Burundi, the Democratic Republic of the Congo, Tanzania, and Zambia.  It grows to a length of 36.0 cm (14.2 inches) TL and is a component of local commercial fisheries.

References

 

Claroteidae
Fish of Africa
Fish described in 1911
Taxonomy articles created by Polbot
Taxobox binomials not recognized by IUCN